is a monorail station on the Chiba Urban Monorail located in Wakaba-ku in the city of Chiba, Chiba Prefecture, Japan.

Lines
Chiba Urban Monorail Line 2

Layout
Chishirodai-Kita Station is an elevated station with two opposed side platforms serving two tracks.

Platforms

History
Chishirodai Station opened on March 28, 1988.

External links

http://chiba-monorail.co.jp map/timetable in English
Chiba Urban Monorail home page 

Railway stations in Japan opened in 1988
Railway stations in Chiba Prefecture